Margaret Drummond (c. 1340 – after 31 January 1375), known also by her first married name as Margaret Logie, was the second queen of David II of Scotland and a daughter of Sir Malcolm de Drummond, 10th Thane of Lennox (b. after 1295 – d. 17 October 1346 at the Battle of Neville's Cross, Durham, England) by his wife Margaret Graham, Countess of Menteith.

Margaret first married Sir John Logie of that Ilk, having by him a son, John of Logie.

To counter Stewart influence, David II of Scotland pardoned John Logie in September 1343, son of a conspirator against Robert the Bruce in 1320, and restored to him the large lordship of Strathgartney bordering the earldoms of Menteith and Lennox. Strathgartney had been held by Sir John Menteith of Arran and Knapdale's family (cadets of the Stewarts and also former keepers of Dumbarton and guardians of Menteith). At the Battle of Neville's Cross in 1346, the king was apparently deserted by some of his subjects and led off to eleven years' captivity in England. After Neville's Cross the Steward as lieutenant would allow John Menteith to recover Strathgartney: This led David, when he returned from England in 1357/58, to try again to restore Logie's sasine.

By 1361/62 Margaret was a mistress to King David who was widowed from his first wife, Joan of The Tower, on 14 August 1362. In addition to David's aid to Margaret's husband John Logie, Margaret's brother, Malcolm Drummond, became coroner of Perth and received new lands in the shire, as did their uncle, John Drummond, whom David would make earl of Menteith in 1360 directly denying a son of the Steward. David's favour to the Drummonds must have fuelled the tension between them and the Stewarts and Campbells: this erupted into a full-blown murderous feud by the 1350s.

Margaret then married David II of Scotland at Inchmurdach in Fife, on 20 February 1364. Her niece Annabella was subsequently married to John Stewart, later king as Robert III and Margaret's grand-nephew by marriage. They had no children and the King divorced her on 20 March 1369 on grounds of infertility. Margaret, however, travelled to Avignon, in southern France, and made a successful appeal to the Pope Urban V to reverse the sentence of divorce which had been pronounced against her in Scotland.  As she had a child from her first marriage, it seems more likely that David himself was infertile, since his thirty-four-year marriage to his first wife also bore no issue.

Margaret survived the King, and was alive on 31 January 1375, but seems to have died soon after that date. Her funeral was paid for by Pope Gregory XI.

References 

 Alison Weir, Britain's Royal Family: A Complete Genealogy
 A pedigree of the Drummonds

Scottish royal consorts
Margaret Drummond
1340 births
1375 deaths
Margaret Drummond
14th-century Scottish women